Leonard S. Mandamin (born 1944) is a judge currently serving on the Federal Court of Canada.

References

1944 births
Living people
Judges of the Federal Court of Canada